Penicillium steckii is a species of fungus in the genus Penicillium which produces citrinin, tanzawaic acid E, tanzawaic acid F.

References

Further reading 
 
 
 
 
 

steckii
Fungi described in 1927